|}

The Vertem Futurity Trophy is a Group 1 flat horse race in Great Britain open to two-year-old thoroughbred colts and fillies. It is run at Doncaster over a distance of 1 mile (1,609 metres), and it is scheduled to take place each year in late October.

History
The event was established in 1961 and was originally called the Timeform Gold Cup. It was founded by Phil Bull, the creator of Timeform, and was backed by this organisation until 1964.

The Observer started to support the event in 1965. The present grading system was introduced in 1971 and the Observer Gold Cup was classed at Group-1 level.

The bookmaker William Hill took over the sponsorship in 1976, and from this point the event was known as the Futurity Stakes. From 1989 to 2017 the race was sponsored by the Racing Post and run as the Racing Post Trophy.

The race was given its current title in 2018, when Vertem Asset Management became the sponsor. The Vertem Futurity Trophy is now the last Group 1 event of the British flat racing season. The 2019 race was run on Newcastle's Tapeta track, after the Doncaster meeting was abandoned because of waterlogging, thereby becoming the first British Group 1 race to be run on an artificial surface.

Five winners have subsequently achieved victory in the following year's Derby: Reference Point (1986); High Chaparral (2001); Motivator (2004); Authorized (2006);
Camelot (2011).

Records
Leading jockey (5 wins):
 Lester Piggott – Ribocco (1966), Noble Decree (1972), Apalachee (1973), Dunbeath (1982), Lanfranco (1984)
 Pat Eddery – Sporting Yankee (1976), Dactylographer (1977), Beldale Flutter (1980), Reference Point (1986), Armiger (1992)

Leading trainer (11 wins):
 Aidan O'Brien - Saratoga Springs (1997), Aristotle (1999), High Chaparral (2001), Brian Boru (2002), St Nicholas Abbey (2009), Camelot (2011), Kingsbarns (2012), Saxon Warrior (2017), Magna Grecia (2018), Luxembourg (2021), Auguste Rodin (2022)

Leading owner (10 wins): (includes part ownership)
 Sue Magnier – Aristotle (1999), High Chaparral (2001), Brian Boru (2002), St Nicholas Abbey (2009), Camelot (2011), Kingsbarns (2012),  Saxon Warrior (2017), Magna Grecia (2018), Luxembourg (2021), Auguste Rodin (2022)

Winners

See also
 Horse racing in Great Britain
 List of British flat horse races
 Recurring sporting events established in 1961 – this race is included under its original title, Timeform Gold Cup.

References

 Paris-Turf: 
 Racing Post:
 galopp-sieger.de – Racing Post Trophy.
 ifhaonline.org – International Federation of Horseracing Authorities – Racing Post Trophy (2019).
 pedigreequery.com – Futurity Stakes – Doncaster.
 pedigreequery.com – Racing Post Trophy – Doncaster.
 

Flat races in Great Britain
Doncaster Racecourse
Flat horse races for two-year-olds
1961 establishments in England